Elections to Wiltshire County Council were held on 4 May 1989.  The whole council was up for election and the result was no overall control.

Results

|}

Results by divisions

Aldbourne and Ramsbury

Alderbury

Amesbury

Bedwyn

Blunsdon

Box

Bradford on Avon North

Bradford on Avon South

Bremhill and Calne Without

Brinkworth

Calne

Chippenham Park

Chippenham Sheldon

Chippenham Town

Collingbourne

Corsham

Cricklade

Devizes

Devizes South and Cannings

Downton

Durrington

Highworth

Holt

Idmiston

Kington

Laverstock

Lavington

Malmesbury

Marlborough

Melksham

Melksham Without

Mere

Pewsey and Enford

Pewsham

Potterne

Purton

Salisbury Bemerton

Salisbury Harnham

Salisbury St Mark

Salisbury St Martin

Salisbury St Paul

Shrewton

Southwick

Stratton St Margaret, Coleview and Nythe

Stratton St Margaret, St Margaret

Stratton St Margaret, St Philip

Swindon Central

Swindon Eastcott

Swindon Eldene

Swindon Freshbrook

Swindon Gorsehill

Swindon Lawns

Swindon Liden

Swindon Moredon

Swindon Park North

Swindon Park South

Swindon South

Swindon Toothill

Swindon Walcot

Swindon Western

Swindon Whitworth

Tisbury

Trowbridge East

Trowbridge South

Trowbridge West

Upper Wylye Valley

Wanborough

Warminster East

Warminster West

Westbury

Whorwellsdown

Wilton

Wootton Bassett North

Wootton Bassett South

Wroughton

References

Wiltshire County Council Election Results - 4 May 1989 at northwilts.gov.uk

External links
Colin Rallings, Michael Thrasher, Wiltshire County Council election Results 1973–2005 at electionscentre.co.uk

1989
1989 English local elections
20th century in Wiltshire